This article lists the performances of each of the 10 national teams which have made at least one appearance in the IHF World Women's Outdoor Handball Championship finals.

Debut of teams
Each successive World Women's Handball Championship has had at least one team appearing for the first time. Teams in parentheses are considered successor teams by IHF.

Participation details
;Legend
 – Champions
 – Runners-up
 – Third place
 – Fourth place
5th – Fifth place
6th – Sixth place
 — Did not qualify
 — Did not enter
 — Hosts

For each tournament, the number of teams in each finals tournament (in brackets) are shown.

Results of host nations

Results of defending champions

References

World Outdoor Handball Championship tournaments